Kristýna Plíšková was the defending champion having won this tournament on the ITF Women's Circuit in 2013. However, she chose not to participate.

Tereza Smitková won the title, defeating Kristina Mladenovic in the final, 7–6(7–4), 7–5.

Seeds

Main draw

Finals

Top half

Bottom half

External Links
 Main draw
 Qualifying draw

Open Gdf Suez De Limoges - Singles
2014 in French tennis
Open de Limoges